In Greek mythology, Melia or Melie (Ancient Greek: Μελίη) was a Bithynian nymph, who was, by Poseidon, the mother of Amycus and Mygdon, both kings of the Bebryces. The name Melia perhaps derived from a misreading of a line of Apollonius of Rhodes containing Βιθυνὶς Μελίη, which instead of being read as Melia from Bithynia, might instead be read as Bithynis the Melia, i.e. Bithynis the ash tree nymph.

Notes

References
 Apollodorus, Apollodorus, The Library, with an English Translation by Sir James George Frazer, F.B.A., F.R.S. in 2 Volumes. Cambridge, MA, Harvard University Press; London, William Heinemann Ltd. 1921.  Online version at the Perseus Digital Library.
 Apollonius of Rhodes, Apollonius Rhodius: the Argonautica, translated by Robert Cooper Seaton, W. Heinemann, 1912. Internet Archive.
 Cameron, Alan, Greek Mythography in the Roman World, Oxford University Press, Sep 2, 2004. 
 Hard, Robin, The Routledge Handbook of Greek Mythology: Based on H.J. Rose's "Handbook of Greek Mythology", Psychology Press, 2004, .
 Hyginus, Gaius Julius, Fabulae in Apollodorus' Library and Hyginus' Fabulae: Two Handbooks of Greek Mythology, Translated, with Introductions by R. Scott Smith and Stephen M. Trzaskoma, Hackett Publishing Company,  2007. .
 Ovid. Heroides. Amores. Translated by Grant Showerman. Revised by G. P. Goold. Loeb Classical Library No. 41. Cambridge, MA: Harvard University Press, 1977. . Online version at Harvard University Press.
 Parada, Carlos, Genealogical Guide to Greek Mythology, Jonsered, Paul Åströms Förlag, 1993. .
 Servius, Commentary on the Aeneid of Vergil, Georgius Thilo, Ed. 1881. Online version at the Perseus Digital Library.
 Smith, William; Dictionary of Greek and Roman Biography and Mythology, London (1873). s.v. Amycus; s.v. Mygdon

Nymphs
Women of Poseidon